Protea curvata (Serpentine sugarbush) is a species of plant in the family Proteaceae. It is endemic to South Africa, and a protected tree there.

References

External links

curvata
Endemic flora of South Africa
Vulnerable flora of Africa
Taxonomy articles created by Polbot
Taxa named by N. E. Brown